Mark Guggenberger (born January 10, 1989) is an American former professional ice hockey goaltender.

Early life 
Guggenberger was born in Richfield, Minnesota. Undrafted, he played major junior hockey in the Western Hockey League with the Portland Winterhawks, Swift Current Broncos and the Kelowna Rockets before playing with his alma mater, the University of Prince Edward Island in the Canadian Interuniversity Sports.

Career 
On July 12, 2014, Guggenberger opted to return to the Gwinnett Gladiators for a second season in 2014–15. Guggenberger appeared in 23 games as the Gladiators back-up to Kent Patterson, before he was traded at the deadline to the Fort Wayne Komets on March 12, 2015.

After tentatively agreeing to a contract in December 2014, Guggenberger signed a one-year deal with for the 2015 season with Australian club, the Perth Thunder of the AIHL, on May 24, 2015.

Awards and honours

References

External links

1989 births
Alaska Aces (ECHL) players
Allen Americans players
American men's ice hockey goaltenders
DVTK Jegesmedvék players
Fort Worth Brahmas players
Fort Wayne Komets players
Gwinnett Gladiators players
Ice hockey players from Minnesota
Kelowna Rockets players
Living people
People from Richfield, Minnesota
Perth Thunder players
Portland Winterhawks players
Rochester Americans players
Swift Current Broncos players
Texas Tornado players
University of Prince Edward Island alumni
UPEI Panthers ice hockey players